Mohammad Nadeem Khan (born 10 December 1969 in Rawalpindi, Punjab) is a Pakistani cricket administrator, coach and former cricketer who played in 2 Tests and 2 ODIs from 1993 to 1999. 

He's the older brother of Pakistan's former wicket-keeper Moin Khan.

Cricket career

Nadeem didn't have a long international cricketing career, best-known for a controversial run-out of Sachin Tendulkar he was involved in as a substitute fielder during the 1998–99 Asian Test Championship. 

He was an effective spinner who has played for Sheffield Collegiate C.C. I XI. 

In April 2019, he was named in the MCC team that played in the 2019 Central American Cricket Championship in Mexico.

Cricket administration
In 2016, Nadeem became the United Bank Limited Sports Complex's head of cricket and was noticed for the positive changes he brought in the UBL's cricket academy that he headed, also managing the UBL cricket team with success.

In November 2017, Nadeem was appointed as manager of the Pakistan Super League franchise Multan Sultans. He has also managed Pakistan U19 sides in two Asia Cups and an ICC U19 Cricket World Cup in 2018-19.

In October 2019, the Pakistan Cricket Board appointed him as the coordinator of the national selection committee, having previously served on the national selection committee in the 2016-17 season.

In May 2020, he was appointed as the PCB’s director of high performance.

In June 2022, he was made director of the inaugural season of the Pakistan Junior League.

Coaching career
Nadeem is an ECB certified level 2 coach who has previously worked as head coach at the Michael Vaughan Academy and the Sheffield Collegiate Cricket Club from 2008 to 2010.

Business
He owned a Mexican restaurant in Sheffield, in the UK, and has also served as the director and general manager of other restaurants for many years.

References

External links
 

1969 births
Living people
Pakistan Test cricketers
Pakistan One Day International cricketers
Pakistani cricketers
Karachi cricketers
Pakistan Automobiles Corporation cricketers
National Bank of Pakistan cricketers
Pakistan International Airlines cricketers
Durham Cricket Board cricketers
Cricketers from Rawalpindi
Pakistan Universities cricketers
Karachi Whites cricketers
Karachi Blues cricketers
Marylebone Cricket Club cricketers
Pakistani cricket administrators
Pakistani cricket coaches